Samuel Griffin (April 20, 1746November 23, 1810) was a lawyer, soldier and politician from Virginia. Following his service during the American Revolutionary War as a Continental Army officer, Griffin served as mayor of Williamsburg, Virginia, as well as represented the former state capitol in the Virginia House of Delegates, then (with surrounding areas) in the U.S. House of Representatives.

Early and family life
Born in Richmond County in the Colony of Virginia. His slightly younger brother Cyrus Griffin would likewise become a Virginia lawyer and patriot, serving as a Continental Congressman representing Virginia's Northern Neck region (where they were raised) and later as federal judge, for what was then the U.S. District Court for the District of Virginia. Earlier, the Griffin boys received a private education appropriate to their class, including classical studies and law.

Samuel Griffin married Elizabeth Corbin Braxton, daughter of prominent Virginia planter and patriot Carter Braxton, likewise of the First Families of Virginia. They had only one child, Elizabeth Corbin Griffin Stewart (1779-1853), who survived two husbands (including a Williamsburg physician) and ultimately died in Philadelphia.

Continental Army officer
During the Revolutionary War Griffin accepted a commission as a colonel in the Continental Army. He was an aide-de-camp to General Charles Lee, likewise from the same Virginia region, and was wounded at the Battle of Harlem Heights on September 16, 1776.

Colonel Griffin recuperated from his wounds near Philadelphia. When the American army retreated behind the Delaware River in December 1776, the commanding general of the Philadelphia Department, Israel Putnam, followed General Washington's instruction and ordered Col. Griffin to "create a distraction" for the British forces then present near Trenton, New Jersey. Thus, Griffin led about 900 militia and Virginia regulars into Mount Holly, from which he harassed the pickets of Colonel Carl von Donop at Bordentown. Colonel Von Donop brought all of his 2,000 or so troops to Mount Holly to punish Griffin in the Battle of Iron Works Hill. However, the action put Von Donop's troops out of position to assist Colonel Rall in Trenton. Thus, on the morning of December 26, 1776, Washington crossed the Delaware and defeated Rall at Trenton. Local lore says a "certain young widow of a doctor" assisted Griffin by detaining von Donop in Mount Holly.

Lawyer and politician
Admitted to the Virginia bar, Griffin practiced law. Following the New Jersey battles, Griffin returned to Virginia and as a citizen soldier served on the State's board of war (1779-1781). During this period, Williamsburg remained strategically important as the colonial capitol and was threatened by British warships offshore in Hampton Roads. Griffin served as Williamsburg's mayor from 1779 to 1780. After the war ended and fellow former soldier and Williamsburg lawyer James Innes became Attorney General of Virginia, Williamsburg voters elected Griffin to replace him in the Virginia House of Delegates and re-elected him twice to the part time position. Thus, he served from 1786 through 1788, when he resigned upon being elected to the U.S. House of Representatives and Edmund Randolph resigned as Virginia's governor (at the time elected by the Virginia General Assembly and having little power) in order to succeed Griffin as Williamsburg's delegate.

Voters from Williamsburg and surrounding areas elected Griffin to the First, Second, and Third Congresses. Thus, he served from March 4, 1789 until March 3, 1795, although the district number changed from Virginia's 10th congressional district to Virginia's 13th congressional district in 1793.

Death and legacy
Griffin died in New York City on November 23, 1810. His grave site is unknown.

References

See also
Retrieved on 2010-01-05
Fischer, David Hackett (2004). Washington's Crossing. New York: Oxford University Press. .

1746 births
1810 deaths
Mayors of Williamsburg, Virginia
Members of the Virginia House of Delegates
Continental Army officers from Virginia
Members of the United States House of Representatives from Virginia
Virginia lawyers